Holton is a central district of Barry in the Vale of Glamorgan 9 miles outside Cardiff in south Wales. As the Central business district of Barry it is dominated by Barry shopping centre and Barry Town Library. It also has Holton Road School which is the biggest primary school in the vale and it was built in 1895.

Neighbourhoods of Barry, Vale of Glamorgan